Filaret Mykhailovych Kolessa (July 17, 1871 – March 3, 1947) was a Ukrainian ethnographer, folklorist, composer, musicologist and literary critic. He was a member of the Shevchenko Scientific Society from 1909, The Free Ukrainian Academy of Sciences from 1929, and the founder of Ukrainian ethnographic musicology.

Biography 

Filaret Mykhailovych Kolessa was born on 17 July 1871 in the Galician village of Tatarsk, (now the village of Pishchane, Lviv Oblast, Ukraine). He studied at the University of Vienna under the composer Anton Bruckner from 1891 to 1892, and completed his studies at the Lviv University in 1896.

Filaret taught in high schools in Lviv, Stryi, and Sambir. He worked with the composer Mykola Lysenko, and the writers Ivan Franko and Lesya Ukrainka. In 1918, he defended his dissertation at the University of Vienna and received the title Doctor of Philology. He studied the rhythms of Ukrainian folk songs of Galicia, Volhynia and Lemkivshchyna. From 1939 he was a professor at Lviv University, from 1940 the director of the State museum of Ethnography in Lviv, director of the Lviv section, of the Institute for Art studies, Folklore and Ethnography of the Academy of Sciences of the Ukrainian SSR (from 1940), and a participant at international conferences of musicologists and philologists at Prague, Warsaw, Vienna, and Antwerp.

Kolessa died on 3 March 1947. He was buried in Lviv.

Family
Filaret had a brother, . He was also the father of Mykola Kolessa and the uncle of Lubka Kolessa.

Main works
 "" (1905), A Survey of Ukrainian-Rus’ Folk Poetry
 "" (19061907), The Rhythms of Ukrainian Folk Songs
 "" (1910, 1913), Melodies of Ukrainian folk dumy, 2 volumes
 "" (19131914), Structure and characteristics of Ukrainian folk melodies
 "" (19201921), Ukrainian folk dumy and their relationship to songs, poems and funeral laments.
 "" (1921), The genesis of Ukrainian folk dumy.
 "" (1923), Folk songs of southern Subcarpathia.
 "" (1925), Recitative forms in Ukrainian folk poetry.
 "" (1928), Ukrainian folk songs at the turn of the 17–18th centuries.
 "" (1929), Folk Songs from the Galician Lemko Region
 "" (1938),The Ukrainian Oral Literature
 "" (1946). Folk song melodies of the Ukrainian Carpathians

Author of numerous choral works and arrangements of Ukrainian folk. Manuscript on the "History of Ukrainian ethnography" is still unpublished.

See also
Preservation of kobzar music

References

Sources

External links 

 
Site of the Ministry of Culture of Ukraine 

1871 births
1947 deaths
20th-century Ukrainian musicians
People from the Kingdom of Galicia and Lodomeria
People from Lviv Oblast
Members of the Shevchenko Scientific Society
University of Lviv alumni
Academic staff of the University of Lviv
University of Vienna alumni
Second convocation members of the Verkhovna Rada of the Ukrainian Soviet Socialist Republic
Recipients of the Order of the Red Banner of Labour
Kobzarstvo
Soviet ethnographers
Soviet folklorists
Soviet male classical composers
Soviet music educators
Soviet musicologists
Ukrainian Austro-Hungarians
Ukrainian classical composers
Ukrainian ethnographers
Ukrainian folklorists
Ukrainian music educators
Kolessa Filaret
Kolessa|Filaret
Burials at Lychakiv Cemetery